Aureliano de Sousa e Oliveira Coutinho, Viscount of Sepetiba (21 July 1800 – 25 September 1855) was a Brazilian politician, judge and monarchist during the period of the Empire of Brazil (1822–1889). He was the leader of the "Courtier Faction", a political faction composed of high-ranking palace servants and notable politicians who exercised a strong influence over Emperor Pedro II in his early years.

1800 births
1855 deaths
People from Niterói
Brazilian monarchists
Brazilian nobility
Ministers of Justice of Brazil